KVP may refer to:

 K. V. P. Ramachandra Rao (born 1948), Indian Member of Parliament
 Karur Vysya Bank, a private-sector Indian bank
 Katholieke Volkspartij (Catholic People's Party), a former Dutch political party
 Key Value Pair, a fundamental data representation in computing systems and applications
 Kisan Vikas Patra, a fixed interest bond issued by the Indian Government
 Peak kilovoltage (kVp), a unit of radiation used in x-ray imaging
 Kalamazoo Vegetable Parchment, a defunct papermill that lent its name to Parchment, Michigan
 Sídlisko KVP, one of the boroughs of the city of Košice, Slovakia